The 1960 United States presidential election in Alaska took place on November 8, 1960, as part of the nationwide presidential election. This was the first presidential election that Alaska participated in. Voters chose three representatives, or electors, to the Electoral College, who voted for president and vice president. 

Alaska was won by incumbent Vice-President Richard Nixon (R-California) with 50.9% of the popular vote against U.S. Senator John F. Kennedy (D-Massachusetts) with 49.1%. Prior to the election, The New York Times declared Kennedy the favorite in the state.

Results

Electors
With statehood, Alaska was given three votes in the Electoral College. This has continued to be the case to the present day. Alaska's electors in 1960 were:

 Charles D. Jones, of Nome
 Milton D. Snodgrass, of Palmer
 Sylvia Ringstad, of Fairbanks

See also
United States presidential elections in Alaska

References

Bibliography

1960 Alaska elections
Alaska
1960